Kamsar–Kamo Sahakyan (born April 16, 1961 in Yeghegnadzor), is an Armenian painter.

Biography
Kamsar–Kamo Sahakyan was born in Yeghegnadzor, Armenia. 1971–1976, he studied at Yeghennadzor Art School, in Van Yeghyan's class, who played great role in the formation of the artist's aesthetic taste and the love towards the abstract painting. 1976–1980 studied painting at the Terlemezian School of Arts in Yerevan. Since 1990 Kamsar is a member of Artists' Union of Armenia. Since 1996 Kmasar is the director of Vayots Dzor Regional Museum of Yeghegnadzor.

Individual exhibitions
 Pictorial art works, Yeghegnadzor Geological Museum, 1999
 Yerevan History Museum, 2013

Group exhibitions
 Republican Youth Exhibition, Youth Palace, Yerevan, 1980
 Group exhibition of Yeghegnzdzor artists, Yeghegnadzor Branch of National Art Gallery of Armenia, 1983
 Republican Youth Exhibition, Exhibition Hall of the Union of Artists, Yerevan, 1984
 Jubilee Exhibition on the 70th anniversary of the USSR, the Union of Artists, Yerevan, 1987
 Portrait Republican Exhibition, the Union of Artists, Yerevan, 1988
 Republican Exhibition "Along History Cross-ways", the Union of Artists, Yerevan, 1989
 "EXPORT SALONS" of Fine Art in Foreign Countries, Moscow, Russia, 1990
 "Armenian Artists on the 75 the Anniversary of the Great Genocide", the Union of Artists, Yerevan, 1990
 Exhibition dedicated to independence of the First Republic of Armenia (1918–1920), Union of Artists, Yerevan, 1991
 Group Exhibition, Detroit, US, Contemporary Russian Expressionism, a major exhibition of twenty Russian artists currently living and working in Moscow, St. Petersburg, Kyiv, Yerevan, New York and Detroit, International Gallery, Detroit, USA, 1993
 "Yeghegnadzor Painters" group exhibition, Yeghegnadzor Geological Museum, 1997
 "NORAVANK-99" Fine Art Exhibition, Yeghegnadzor Branch of National Art Gallery of Armenia, Yeghegnadzor, 1999
 "Painters of Vayots Dzor and Syunik" Fine Art Exhibition of Works, Goris Art Gallery, Goris, 2005
 "Exhibition of Vayots Dzor Painters' Works", Yeghegnadzor Geological Museum, 2010
 Joint Exhibition of Armenian Iranian Art, Yeghegnadzor Geological Museum, 2012
 "One work Exhibition" on the 80th anniversary of RA artists, the Union of Artists, Yerevan, 2012

Works
Kamsar is an artist of all colors.

 "The Land and the Sky"
 "Spring"
 "Struggle for Existence"
 "Earthquake"
 "Delight"
 "White Spring of My Memory"
 "Hijacking"
 "Family"
 "The White Spring of my Memory"
 "In Memory of Lusine Zakaryan"
 "Duch Motif"
 "Capture"
 "Interpersonal Flash"
 "Embarrasement"
 "An Autumn Day"
 "Mountains"
 "Awakening"

Gallery

See also
List of Armenian artists
List of Armenians
Culture of Armenia

References

External links

 Catalog KAMSAR, Yerevan, 2013, 
  The individual exhibition of Kamsar’s works in the Yerevan History Museum
 Kamsar- The Artist Of All The Colors And Emotions

1961 births
Armenian painters
Living people
People from Vayots Dzor Province
Soviet artists